1918 in radio details the internationally significant events in radio broadcasting for the year 1918.


Events
 10 April – Alexander M. Nicholson files a patent for the radio crystal oscillator.
 2 September – The first radio broadcast from the United Kingdom to Australia is made by Amalgamated Wireless to the home of Ernest Fisk in Sydney.
 11 November – Armistice ends World War I.
 Edwin Howard Armstrong develops the superheterodyne receiver.
 A 200 kW alternator starts operating at Station NFF, the United States Navy station at Somerset, New Jersey, the most powerful radio transmitter at this time.

Births

April
 16 – Spike Milligan, British comedian, writer, musician, poet and playwright (d. 2002)
 26 – William Hardcastle, British radio news presenter (d. 1975)

June
 18 – Isobel Barnett, British broadcasting personality (suicide 1980)

August
 8 – Salty Brine, longtime morning host at WPRO on Rhode Island (d. 2004)
 9 – Giles Cooper, Anglo-Irish broadcast dramatist (d. 1966)

September
 4 – Paul Harvey, American radio broadcaster (d. 2009)
 22 – Betty Wragge, American actress of the Golden Age of Radio (d. 2002)
 26 – John Zacherle, American television and radio host, singer and voice actor (d. 2016)

References

 
Radio by year